Miconia nervosa is a species of shrub in the family Melastomataceae. It is native to North and South America.

References

nervosa